Virginia Nelson (born Virginia Marie Shoemaker; November 22, 1924 Rochester, New York – November 27, 1998 Nyack, New York), professionally known as Ginny Gibson, was a prolific New York recording vocalist. Gibson recorded jingles and popular songs. Her married surname, beginning around 1946, was Nelson. In 1958, she married Richard Dennis Criger (1925–2001). She divorced Criger in 1976. Gibson also recorded under the alias "Ginny Blue."

Career 
Virginia Shoemaker, as a performer, began singing at age 6 for WHAM radio in Rochester, New York. In 1950, Gibson signed a contract with MGM Records. She was the first to record the song s "Mr. Sandman," "If I Give My Heart to You," and "Dansero." Her recording of "Whatever Lola Wants" from Damn Yankees won national radio and jukebox play. Her manager while at MGM was Joan Javits (né Joan Ellen Javits; born 1931), who in 1953, co-wrote Santa Baby with Philip Springer (born 1926). The other co-composer, Tony Springer, listed in the 1953 Catalog of Copyright Entries, was a fictitious name. Joan was the niece of New York Senator Jacob K. Javits.

In 1954, Gibson recorded 966 new tunes for such songwriters that included Irving Berlin; Cole Porter; Pajama Game and Damn Yankees writers Jerry Ross and Dick Adler; Charles Tobias; and Pat Ballard.

Gibson also sang radio and TV commercials, including the famous "Chiquita Banana," "Hello, Bryers Calling," "Winston Tastes Good," "The Dodge Boys," "Wouldn't You Really Rather Have a Buick?" and "Pepsodent Toothpaste."

She was the off-stage voice on the Coke Time with Eddie Fisher television show, working with Doc Severinsen, Eydie Gormé, and Debbie Reynolds. She was also heard regularly on the Chicago radio show Don McNeill's Breakfast Club and television's The Halls of Ivy and Sky King.

Selected discography

M-G-M Records 

 10661 (April 1950)Ginny GibsonWith Van Horne QuartetSide A: "You're Finding Out How Much I Love You"Carl G. Lampl (1898–1962) (music)Buddy Kaye (words)48-S-551Side B: "Where in the World"Ginny Gibson, vocalistGibson Boys, vocalists48-S-550Carl G. Lampl (1898–1962)Buddy Kaye
 11276Buddy Kaye QuintetGinny GibsonSide A: "The Sunday Morning Song"48-S-552Carl G. Lampl (1898–1962) (music)Buddy Kaye (words)Side B: "The Goodnight Song"48-S-553Buddy KayeCarl G. Lampl (1898–1962)
 11383 (1952)Ginny GibsonSide A: "Too Far Between Kisses"48-S-817Side B: "You Blew Me a Kiss" 48-S-816(Audio on YouTube)
 11435 (1953)Ginny GibsonWith OrchestraLeRoy Holmes, conductorSide A: "The Kiss"(from the 1953 film Niagara)Haven Gillespie (words)Lionel Newman (music)53-S-5Side B: "Condemned Without a Trial"Hal Blair (né Harold Keller Brown; 1915–2001) (w&m)Don Robertson (w&m)53-S-6
 11499Ginny GibsonWith Joe LipmanSide A: "Unless You're Really Mine"Ted Varnick (w&m)Nick Acquaviva (w&m)53-S-199(Audio on YouTube)Side B: "Lonely Lover"53-S-198Herbert Nelson (music)Fred Jacobson (words)
 11571 (1953)Ginny GibsonWith Joe LipmanSide A: "Dansero"53-S-345Heyman-Daniels-ParkerSide B: "No More Tears"53-S-344Frank Feraco (words)Harry Siskind (words)Paul Todd (music)
 11672Ginny GibsonWith orchestraJoe Lipman, directorSide A: "Baton Rouge"Bob Merrill (w&m)53-S-608Side B: "Don't Stop Kissing Me Goodnight"Sheb Wooley (w&m)53-S-610
 11736 (1953)Ginny GibsonWith OrchestraJoe Lipman, directorSide A: "Aye Aye Aye Aye"Gloria Shane (words)Joe Lipman (music)Noel Regney53-S-609Side B: "Serenade to Spring"Dick CharlesGloria Regney53-S-607
 11814 (1954)Ginny GibsonSide A: "The Song That Broke My Heart"54-S-358Side B: "There's a Small Hotel"54-S-356
 11913 (1954)Ginny GibsonWith Joe LipmanSide A: "Once There Was a Little Girl"54-S-355Hayward Morris (1922–1977) (music)Lee Kauderer (words)Side B: "Like Ma-A-D"54-S-357Alice D. Simms (w&m)Irving Roth (music)
 11961 (March 1955)Ginny GibsonThe Four Jingles (vocals)Side A: "Whatever Lola Wants" ("Lola Gets")From the musical Damn YankeesRichard Adler (w&m)Jerry Ross (w&m)(Audio on YouTube)Side B: "If Anything Should Happen to You"Dick Charles (w&m)Fred Ebb (w&m)55-S-312
 12019 (July 1955)Ginny GibsonWith OrchestraJoe Lipman, conductorThe Four Jingles (on Side B)Side A: "Chihuahua Choo-Choo" ("Chi-Wa-Wa")From the Los Angeles revue:That's Life (1954)Jay Livingston (w&m)Ray Evans (w&m)55-XY-219Side B: "Am I Asking Too Much?"Robert Bergman (w&m)Harry Evans (w&m)George Ames (w&m)55-XY-217
 12113 (1955)Ginny GibsonWith OrchestraAnd the JinglesJoe Lipman, conductorSide A: OHH ("How I Love Ya'")Parker55-XY-578Side B: "If You Want To Make Me Happy"Harold Solomon (music)Jack Segal (words)55-S-765
 12517Ginny GibsonWith orchestraJoe Lipman, conductorAnd with the JinglesSide A: "If That Would Bring You Back To Me"Eddie Seiler (w&m)Sol Marcus (w&m)55-XY-580Side B: "The Places I've Been"Sy MuskinSol Parker55-XY-577

Mercury Records 

5405 (1950)Recorded March 14, 1950, New YorkBobby Sherwood (trumpet, piano, guitar, vocals, arranger), Lou Oles, Carl Poole (né Carl Alan Poole; 1920–1986), Pincus (Pinky) Savitt (1919–1998) (trumpets), Eddie Anderson, Bob Cutshall, Kai Winding (trombones), Hymie Shertzer, Ernie Caceres (alto saxes), Johnny Hayes, Babe Russin (tenor saxes), Tony Ferina (bari sax), Lou Stein (piano), Sid Weiss (bass), Morey Feld (drums), Ginny Gibson (vocalist)Side A: "Muskrat Ramble"Sherwood & Gibson (vocals)Ray Gilbert (words)Edward "Kid" Ory (music)3235Side B: "Dixieland Ball"Ginny Gibson (vocals)Buddy Kaye (words)Al Frisch (né Albert T. Frisch; 1916–1976) (music)3237
 5468 (1950)Recorded March 14, 1950, New YorkGinny GibsonBobby SherwoodAnd His Orchestra(same musicians as 5405)Side A: "Cherry Bounce"Charles Columbus (w&m)3238(Audio on YouTube)Side B: "Doodle-Doo-Doo"Art Kassel (w&m)Mel Stitzel (music)3236

Voco Records (sub-label: Tops for Tots) 

 Tops for Tots V29Bernie Knee (vocals)Ginny Gibson (vocals)With the Tops OrchestraSide B: Kiddie Medley"Row, Row, Row Your Boat""Brother John" ("Frère Jacques")
 Voco V30T (1951)Ginny Gibson(singer and narrator)With the Voco OrchestraSide A: Little Red RidinghoodTed Murry(pseudonym of Murray Mencher (de); 1898–1991) (music)Raymond Leveen (1893–1984) (words)
 Tops for Tots V33Bob Kennedy (narrator and singer)Ginny Gibson (narrator and singer)Sides A & B: Cinderella

RCA Victor Records 

 47-4212Ginny GibsonWith Hugo Winterhalter and Orchestra Side B: "Blow, Blow Winds of the Sea" (1953)Harold Duncan (w&m)E1-VB-2901-1(Audio on YouTube)
47-4510 (1952)The Three SunsArtie Dunn (vocal refrain)Ginny Gibson (vocal refrain)Side A: "Stolen Love"Anna Marie Sickle (w&m)Marlene Feinstein (w&m)E2-VB-5543(Audio on YouTube)Side B: "Cool, Cool Kisses"
 EPB 3051 (1953) (7" 45 rpm; 2 discs)LPM 1185 (1956) (LP)Music by StarlightHugo Winterhalter and his OrchestraEddie Heywood (piano); Ginny Gibson (vocals)Stuart Foster(stage name for Tamer Aswad; 1923–1968)

Jubilee Records 

 45-6027 (1953)Ginny GibsonAnd the Shepherds (Side A)With Billy Mure, guitarist (Side A)With the Country Slickers (Side B)Side A: "If the End of the World Came Tonight"Sid Lippman (music)Sylvia Dee (words)45-T5-107Side B: "Ain't It Great to Be Crazy"Sid Lippman (music)Sylvia Dee (words)45-T5-108Note: Red record vinyl

ABC-Paramount Records 

45-9717 (Jun 1956)Don Costa OrchestraWith Ginny GibsonSide A: "Lullaby To An Angel"Dick Broderick (w&m)346-N1Side B: "Magic Melody"Earl Stanley Shuman (born 1923) (words)Mort Garson345-N1
 45-9739 (1956)Ginny GibsonWith Don Costa and His OrchestraSide A: "Miracle of Love"Bob Merrill (words)AMP 45-465(Audio on YouTube)Side B: "Two Innocent Hearts"Dorian Burton (w&m)Lee Pincus (w&m)AMP 45-466(Audio on YouTube)Re-released by:Sparton Records526R (catalog no.)
 45-9786 (February 1957)With orchestra and chorusDon Costa, directorSide A: "I Pledge Allegiance To Your Heart"William "Bill" Norvas (w&m)AMP 45-695Side B: "A Pair of Fools"Bennie Benjamin (w&m)Sol Marcus (w&m)AMP 45-696Re-released by:Sparton Records370R (catalog no.)
 9872 (December 1957)Ginny GibsonSide A: "September 'til June"Sol Parker (né Solomon Peskin; 1919–2010) (w&m)Dick Broderick (w&m)3044Side B: "Homing Pigeon"Mel Mandel (words)Marvin Kahn (1915–1969) (music)3045Re-released by:Sparton Records520R (catalog no.)

Forum Records (Charles Records)

 F703 (1962)Ginny GibsonSide A: "Hand of Love"Dick Broderick61-L-7Side B: "Stay Here, Bluebird"Adaptation from Massenet's "Elegy"Fay Tishman (1913–2006) (words and arr.)
 85276 (July 1962)Ginny GibsonDick Wess OrchestraSide A: "As The World Turns"Dick Charles (music)Fay Tishman (words)ZTSP 85276Side B: "That's How Love Comes"Dick Charles (music)Robert Wilde (pseudonym of Robert Goldstein) (w&m)
DC102469 (1969)Ginny GibsonSide B: "Lonely Little Christmas Tree"Dick CharlesDC102469B

Davis Records (Joe Davis) 

 442-45 (October 1955)Ginny GibsonAccompanied by the Song SpinnersSide A: "Wanting You"Robert Maurice Wilson (born 1921) (w&m)DA-350-45Side B: "Mommy's Little Angel"Glenn Gibson(pseudonym of Bert Davis)DA-349-45"Wanting You" alsoReleased by DerbyCat No. 810; mx DA-171

Kama Records 

K-35 (May 1962)Ginny GibsonR. Wess OrchestraSide A: "You Pass This Way" ("Only Once")Sunny Skylar (w&m)Al Frisch (né Albert T. Frisch; 1916–1976)R. Wess (arr.)500Side B: "Bluesville"Dick CharlesDick CrigerKama was a division of Kama Productions, 9 Meadow Street, New York Mills, New York

Selected radio transcriptions 

 The Eddie Safranski Orchestra, SESAC transcriptions
Program #N-902 (May 17, 1955)
 Program #N-903 (May 17, 1955)
 Program #N-904

 Bud's Bandwagon
 Program 533, Part 1 (June 8, 1955)Bud's BandwagonArmed Forces Radio and Television Service (AFRTS)Broadcast June 8, 1955Radio transcription discBud's Bandwagon was a radio program of the Armed Forces Radio and Television Service, aired five days a week for four years. Bud Widom (né Leonard Widom; 1918–1976) was the DJ host.  The music was from extant recordings rather than live performances.

Family 
Ginny Gibson's father, Wayne A. Shoemaker (1902–1962) had, at one time, been Public Relations Director of the Rochester Civic Music Association.  Wayne Shoemaker was also a strong regional chess player — affiliated with the Finger Lakes Chess Society.

Death 
Virginia M. Criger died November 27, 1998, in Nyack, New York. She was buried in Mount Repose Cemetery, Haverstraw, New York.  Etched at the top of her tombstone are the words of the title song she once recorded, "You Pass This Way Only Once."  And at the bottom are the words, "Our Beloved 'Ginny Gibson.'"

Selected compositions 
 "What a Nervous Situation"
 Ginny Gibson (w&m)
 Dick Broderick (w&m)
 © Sikorski Music Corp., New York
 31 January 1956; EP96565

References

Notes

Inline citations 

1924 births
1998 deaths
20th-century American women singers
American blues singers
American women pop singers
Swing singers
Torch singers
Traditional pop music singers
Big band singers
RCA Victor artists
Musicians from Rochester, New York
20th-century American singers